The 1973–74 Washington State Cougars men's basketball team represented Washington State University for the 1973–74 NCAA Division I men's basketball season. Led by second-year head coach George Raveling, the Cougars were members of the Pacific-8 Conference and played their home games on campus at the new Performing Arts Coliseum in Pullman, Washington.

The court surface at the new coliseum was tartan (polyurethane) for its first decade; a traditional hardwood floor debuted in the fall of 1983.

References

External links
Sports Reference – Washington State Cougars: 1973–74 basketball season

Washington State Cougars men's basketball seasons
Washington State Cougars
Washington State
Washington State